The 1987 President's Cup International Football Tournament was the 16th competition of Korea Cup. The competition was held from 8 to 21 June 1987, and was won by South Korea for the tenth time, who defeated Australia in the final.

Group stage

Group A

The match was ceased in the 29th minute, because tear gas fired to disperse protesters by the police was spread into the stadium. It was finished without a rematch on demand of Egypt national team.

Group B

Knockout stage

Bracket

Semi-finals

Final

See also
Korea Cup
South Korea national football team results

References

External links
President's Cup 1987 (South Korea) at RSSSF
Deportivo Español - 1986/1987 at oGol 

1987